Peperomia vazquezii is a species of perennial and lithophyte from the genus 'Peperomia'. It grows in wet tropical biomes. It was discovered by Guido Mathieu and Daniela Vergara-Rodríguez in 2010.

Etymology
vazquezii from the surname of José Antonio Vázquez-García. José Antonio Vázquez-García is a Mexican botanist that discovered plants like Magnolia pacifica, Magnolia iltisiana and Magnolia panamensis.

Distribution
Peperomia vazquezii is native to Mexico. Specimens can be found at an elevation of 150-200 meters.

Mexico
Veracruz
Uxpanapa

References

vazquezii
Flora of North America
Flora of Mexico
Plants described in 2010